Evelyn Šilina (born 5 April 2001) is an Estonian footballer who plays as a defender for Tallinna Kalev and the Estonia women's national team.

Career
She made her debut for the Estonia national team on 6 March 2020 against Wales, coming on as a substitute for Lisette Tammik.

References

2001 births
Living people
Women's association football defenders
Estonian women's footballers
Estonia women's international footballers
JK Tallinna Kalev (women) players
Footballers from Tallinn